Dmitri Borisovich Zakharov (born 29 January 1971 in Revda) is a former Russian football player.

References

1971 births
People from Revda, Sverdlovsk Oblast
Living people
Soviet footballers
FC Ural Yekaterinburg players
Russian footballers
FC Uralets Nizhny Tagil players
Russian Premier League players
Association football forwards
Association football midfielders
Sportspeople from Sverdlovsk Oblast